Funaoka Station is the name of multiple train stations in Japan.

Funaoka Station (Kyoto) in Kyoto Prefecture
Funaoka Station (Miyagi) in Miyagi Prefecture